UFC Fight Night: Cowboy vs. Miller (also known as UFC Fight Night 45) was a mixed martial arts event held on July 16, 2014, at Revel Casino Hotel in Atlantic City, New Jersey.

Background
The event was headlined by a lightweight bout between Donald Cerrone and Jim Miller.

Zak Cummings was briefly linked to a bout with Kenny Robertson at the event. Cummings was pulled from the fight in favor of a matchup with Gunnar Nelson a few days later at UFC Fight Night 46 after his opponent Ryan LaFlare was removed from that card.  Subsequently, Robertson was removed from the card entirely and rescheduled to face Ildemar Alcântara a week earlier at UFC 175.

Rick Story was expected to face John Howard at the event. Howard was forced out of the bout with an injury and replaced by Leonardo Mafra.

Jim Alers was expected to face Lucas Martins at the event. Alers pulled out of the bout, citing injury, and was replaced by Alex White.

Leo Kuntz was expected to make his UFC debut against Yosdenis Cedeno at the event. Kuntz was forced from the bout with an injury and replaced by promotional newcomer Jerrod Sanders.

The preliminary card bout between Cláudia Gadelha and Tina Lähdemäki was the first women's strawweight fight in UFC history.

Results

Bonus awards
The following fighters were awarded $50,000 bonuses:
 Fight of the Night: John Lineker vs. Alptekin Özkılıç
 Performance of the Night: Donald Cerrone and Lucas Martins

See also
List of UFC events
2014 in UFC

References

UFC Fight Night
Mixed martial arts in New Jersey
Sports competitions in Atlantic City, New Jersey
2014 in mixed martial arts